Stolpersteine is the German name for small, cobblestone-sized memorials placed around Europe by the German artist Gunter Demnig. They commemorate the victims of Nazi Germany who were murdered, deported, exiled or driven to suicide. The first Stolpersteine in Milan, the capital of the Italian region of Lombardia, were established in January 2017.

Generally, the blocks are posed in front of the building where the victims had their last self-chosen residence. The name of the Stolpersteine in Italian is pietre d'inciampo.

Milan

Collocation dates
The Stolpersteine of Milan were all collocated by Gunter Demnig personally at the following dates.
 19 January 2017: Corso Magenta, 55; Via dei Chiostri, 2; Via Gaspare Spontini, 8; Via Milazzo, 4; Via Plinio, 20; Via Vespri Siciliani, 71
 19 January 2018: Via Bezzecca, 1; Viale Caldara, 11; Via dei Cinquecento, 20; Via privata Hermada, 4; Via Marcona, 34; Via Sarfatti, 25; Viale Monza, 23; Viale Piceno, 33
 20 January 2018: Piazzale Cadorna, 15; Via Borgonuovo, 5; Via Mengoni, 2; Via Stradella 13; Viale Lombardia, 65
 23 January 2018: Via Bizzoni, 7; via Conca del Naviglio, 7; via Corridoni, 1; via De Amicis, 45; via De Togni, 10

See also 
 List of cities by country that have stolpersteine
 Stolpersteine in Italy

References

External links

 Stolpersteine.eu, official website of Gunter Demnig

Milan
Stolpersteine
Holocaust commemoration
Monuments and memorials in Milan
2012 sculptures
2013 sculptures